The Janka hardness test, created by Austrian-born American researcher Gabriel Janka (1864–1932), measures the resistance of a sample of wood to denting and wear. It measures the force required to embed an  steel ball halfway into a sample of wood. (The diameter was chosen to produce a circle with an area of 100 square millimeters [one square centimeter].) 

A common use of Janka hardness ratings is to determine whether a species is suitable for use as flooring. For hardwood flooring, the test usually requires a  sample with a thickness of at least 6–8 mm, and the most commonly used test is the ASTM D1037. When testing wood in lumber form, the Janka test is always carried out on wood from the tree trunk (known as the heartwood), and the standard sample (according to ASTM D143) is at 12% moisture content and clear of knots.

The hardness of wood varies with the direction of the wood grain. Testing on the surface of a plank, perpendicular to the grain, is said to be of "side hardness".  Testing the cut surface of a stump is called a test of "end hardness".  Side hardness may be further divided into "radial hardness" and "tangential hardness", although the differences are minor and often neglected.

The results are stated in various ways, leading to confusion, especially when the actual units employed are often not attached. The resulting measure is always one of force. In the United States, the measurement is in pounds-force (lbf). In Sweden, it is in kilograms-force (kgf), and in Australia, either in newtons (N) or kilonewtons (kN). This confusion is greatest when the results are treated as units, for example "660 Janka".

The Janka hardness test results tabulated below followed ASTM D 1037-12 testing methods. Lumber stocks tested range from 1" to 2" thick. The tabulated Janka hardness numbers are an average. There is a standard deviation associated with each species, but these values are not given. No testing was done on actual flooring. 

Other factors affect how flooring performs: the type of core for engineered floorings, such as pine, HDF, poplar, oak, or birch; grain direction and thickness; floor or top wear surface, etc. The chart is not to be considered an absolute; it is meant to help people understand which woods are harder than others.

Typical Janka hardness values

References

External links 
 Janka Hardness Scale For Wood – Side Hardness Chart of Some Woods
 USDA – Wood Handbook – Wood as an Engineering Material 
 USDA – Janka Hardness Using Nonstandard Specimens 

Woodworking
Woodcarving
Wood
Hardness tests